John Chayka (born June 9, 1989) is the former general manager of the Arizona Coyotes of the National Hockey League (NHL). Previously, he served as assistant general manager of the Coyotes. Prior to joining the Coyotes, Chayka was part of an analytics company called Stathletes, and completed his education at the University of Western Ontario's Ivey Business School.

Chayka was the youngest general manager in NHL history, being 26 years of age at the time he became general manager of the Coyotes in May 2016. The Coyotes posted a 131–147–38 record under his four seasons as general manager. The franchise also clinched their first playoff berth since 2012 during this period. Chayka abruptly resigned from his position on July 26, 2020, just one day before the start of the 2020 Stanley Cup playoffs.

On January 25, 2021, Chayka was suspended from working in the NHL for the remainder of the 2021 calendar year. NHL Commissioner Gary Bettman cited "conduct detrimental to the league and game", and further ruled that Chayka had "breached his obligation to the club" by pursuing opportunities with other clubs while still under contract with the Arizona Coyotes, and then terminating his contract with three years remaining. Chayka and the Coyotes were later revealed to have hosted a private scouting combine for draft prospects, which is strictly forbidden by the NHL. The Coyotes were subsequently forced to forfeit their second-round selection in the 2020 draft and their first-round pick in the 2021 draft.

Chayka and his wife Kathryn, through their company Compass Restaurant Group, own 12 Wendy's franchises.

References

1989 births
Living people
Arizona Coyotes executives
National Hockey League executives
National Hockey League general managers
Cowichan Valley Capitals players
Ice hockey people from Ontario
People from the Regional Municipality of Niagara